Luke Nelson (December 4, 1893 – November 14, 1985) was a Major League Baseball pitcher. In nine career games, he had a 3–0 record with a 2.96 ERA. He batted and threw right-handed.

Nelson was born in Cable, Illinois and died in Moline, Illinois.

External links

1893 births
1985 deaths
New York Yankees players
Major League Baseball pitchers
Baseball players from Illinois